Caoimhe Archibald (born 20 February 1981) is an Irish Sinn Féin politician.

Biography
Archibald is a native of Coleraine where she attended Loreto College.  She proceeded to Queen's University, Belfast where she obtained a BSc and PhD in molecular mycology. She then worked for an agri-food company in Dublin.

Political career
She unsuccessfully stood for election in the East Londonderry Westminster constituency at the 2015 UK general election, polling 6,859 votes, equating to 19.8% of the total vote.

She was elected as an MLA at the 2016 Northern Ireland Assembly election, to represent the East Londonderry constituency. She won the seat from her party running mate Cathal Ó hOisín.  She was re-elected in 2017 and 2022.

References

1982 births
Irish women scientists
Living people
People from Coleraine, County Londonderry
Sinn Féin MLAs
Northern Ireland MLAs 2016–2017
Northern Ireland MLAs 2017–2022
Alumni of Queen's University Belfast
Irish pathologists
Female members of the Northern Ireland Assembly
Politicians from County Londonderry
Sinn Féin parliamentary candidates
Northern Ireland MLAs 2022–2027